Leroy "Lee" Cronin FRSE FRSC (born 1 June 1973) is the Regius Chair of Chemistry in the School of Chemistry at the University of Glasgow. He was elected to the Fellowship of the Royal Society of Edinburgh, the Royal Society of Chemistry, and appointed to the Regius Chair of Chemistry in 2013. He was previously the Gardiner Chair, appointed April 2009. In 2022, Cronin was suspended for three months from the Royal Society of Chemistry for a breach of their code of conduct.

Biography
Cronin was awarded BSc (1994) and PhD (1997) from the University of York. From 1997 to 1999, he was a Leverhulme fellow at the University of Edinburgh working with Neil Robertson. From 1999-2000 he worked as an Alexander von Humboldt research fellow in the laboratory of Achim Mueller at the University of Bielefeld (1999–2000). In 2000, he joined the University of Birmingham as a Lecturer in Chemistry, and in 2002 he moved to a similar position at the University of Glasgow.

In 2005, he was promoted to Reader at the University of Glasgow, EPSRC Advanced Fellow followed by promotion to Professor of Chemistry in 2006, and in 2009 became the Gardiner Professor. In 2013, he became the Regius Professor of Chemistry (Glasgow).

Cronin gave the opening lecture at TEDGlobal conference in 2011 in Edinburgh. He outlined the initial steps his team at University of Glasgow is taking to create inorganic biology, life composed of non-carbon-based material.

Cronin has published over 450 papers, and given 560 lectures. He runs a large research group and holds EPSRC Programme, Platform Grants and was awarded a European Research Council (ERC) Advanced Grant.

Lee's work on assembly theory was recently the subject of an interview with Lex Fridman and later with his collaborator Sara Imari Walker

Awards and recognition 

 2007 Philip Leverhulme Prize by the Leverhulme Trust

 2012 Royal Society of Chemistry Corday–Morgan medal
 2014 recognised as one of the UK's top 10 Inspiring Scientists and Engineers (RISE) as well as being recognised as one of the top 100 UK practising Scientists by the UK Science Council.

 2015 Royal Society of Edinburgh BP / Hutton Prize for Energy innovation. Royal Society of Chemistry Tilden Prize.

 2018 American Chemical Society Inorganic Chemistry Lectureship

 2020-2022 Cronin and his co-workers won a series of NIH challenge prizes for their work using the Chemputer and Assembly theory to explore chemical space to invent new drugs using a new platform for drug discovery to help treat Opiate additction. 

Cronin was the subject of a film entitled Inorganica, which documents the progress of his research in inorganic biology and origins of life.

Controversy 
In 2022, the Royal Society of Chemistry announced Cronin had been suspended for a three month period following the hearing of a complaint by its disciplinary committee. Cronin was found to have breached the RSC's code of conduct.

See also
 Assembly theory, an experimentally verifiable way to detect signatures of extraterrestrial life, led by Cronin

References

External links
 The Cronin Group
 Cronin biography
 
  (2011)
  (2012)

Scottish chemists
Academics of the University of Glasgow
Living people
Alumni of the University of York
1973 births
Academics of the University of Birmingham
Researchers of artificial life
Regius Professors
Fellows of the Royal Society of Edinburgh
Fellows of the Royal Society of Chemistry
21st-century British chemists